Ballinafad is a village in the south of County Sligo in the west of Ireland. The village overlooks Lough Arrow, and is itself overlooked by the ruins of Ballinafad Castle. The 1st Marquess of Osorno, who became governor of Chile and viceroy of Perú, was born in this area. Osorno was the father of Bernardo O'Higgins, leader of South American emancipation. The Most Rev. Dr John Healy, Lord Archbishop of Tuam from 1903 to 1918, was also born and raised in Ballinafad.

Ballinafad is in the south of the Barony of Tirerrill. There is also a village called Ballinafad in County Galway, and a large house called Ballinafad House in County Mayo which featured on The Great House Revival on RTÉ in 2018.

See also
 List of towns in the Republic of Ireland

References

Towns and villages in County Sligo